Dulanto is a Spanish surname. Notable people with the surname include:

 Alberto Ismodes Dulanto (born 1910), Peruvian chess master
 Alfonso Dulanto (born 1969), Peruvian professional footballer
 Alfonso Dulanto Rencoret (born 1943), Peruvian politician
 Gustavo Dulanto, (born 1995), Peruvian professional footballer
 Héctor Chumpitaz Dulanto (born 1943), Peruvian footballer
 Laura Esther Rodriguez Dulanto (1872–1919), first female physician in Peru
 Manuel Cipriano Dulanto (1801–1867), Peruvian military man
 Santiago María Ramírez Ruíz de Dulanto (1891–1967), Dominican priest and professor

Spanish-language surnames